A shopping concierge provides either personal assistance in shopping in a particular area, usually a tourist shopping spot, or sometimes associated with pre-order shopping service. Shopping concierge service has grown as shoppers face difficulties shopping internationally. Merchants or stores that do not support international shipping usually become the source of shopping concierge business, while shoppers in countries where big brands and stores are not available become their target market. Shopping concierges usually charge by time (hours or daily) or as a percentage or fixed price per shopping transaction.

See also
 Concierge
 Concierge medicine

Retail store elements
Personal care and service occupations
People in retailing